Marc Brown (born March 10, 1979) is a Canadian former professional ice hockey player. He is an assistant coach with Villacher SV of the Austrian Hockey League.

Career 
Brown turned professional in 1999, and played five season with the Worcester IceCats of the American Hockey League (AHL), scoring 79 goals for the IceCats to establish the team's record for most career goals scored. Brown relocated to Germany to play the 2004–05 season with the Augsburger Panther. He bounced around the European leagues until hanging up his skates following the 2011–12 season.

Career statistics

References

External links

Living people
1979 births
ATSE Graz players
Augsburger Panther players
Canadian ice hockey coaches
Canadian ice hockey left wingers
EC VSV players
Graz 99ers players
HC Alleghe players
EHC Kloten players
Nyköpings Hockey players
Prince Albert Raiders players
SC Langenthal players
Spokane Chiefs players
Worcester IceCats players
Canadian expatriate ice hockey players in Austria
Canadian expatriate ice hockey players in Italy
Canadian expatriate ice hockey players in Germany
Canadian expatriate ice hockey players in Switzerland
Canadian expatriate ice hockey players in Sweden